Stoffel du Plessis (27 December 1932 – 8 March 2000) born Christoffel Petrus du Plessis, in the district of Lichtenburg, was a South African amateur and professional middleweight boxer of the 1950s.

Early life
Du Plessis was born in the district of Lichtenburg, Transvaal, where his father, a Boer farmer originally from the Wolmaransstad district, earned a living as diamond digger at Elandsputte. After completing school, Du Plessis completed his apprenticeship in Johannesburg to become a bricklayer. Stoffel had a younger brother, Botha du Plessis, a 1956 Olympic boxer.

Amateur career
Du Plessis' amateur record dates from 1948, when he fought for two years as a junior at weights ranging from 114 and 135 pounds. His career as senior lasted from 1950 to 1952, competing at 140 pounds, 147 pounds, 156 pounds and finally at 165 pounds. During this time, he represented South Africa at the Commonwealth Games. On 17 April 1952, Du Plessis lost to Theuns van Schalkwyk on points during the final of the South African trials for the 1952 Olympic Games. Van Schalkwyk, who was the reigning Commonwealth champion, went on to win silver at the said Olympic Games. Du Plessis finished his amateur career on 27 September 1952, with a first-round knockout of A Nel in Bloemfontein, amassing a record of 30-19-3 (16 KO). As an amateur he was crowned both Transvaal and South African middleweight champion.

Professional career
The Transvaal Board of Control for Professional Boxing and Wrestling granted Du Plessis his professional boxing license on 6 February 1953.  After his first four bouts, and victories over Corrie van Niekerk and Alex Weiss,  Du Plessis was ranked as Class A by the magazine Boxing Round-Up.  After fighting 13 more times during the next three years, Du Plessis earned a title shot against reigning South African middleweight champion, Mike Holt.

Holt vs. Du Plessis 

 Du Plessis fought Mike Holt for the South African Middleweight title in the Durban City Hall on 12 September 1956.

On fight night, Du Plessis weighed 5½ pounds less than Holt. By the second round, “Holt’s nose was a dull red blob on his face, thanks to Du Plessis’s left jabs, which found a way through Holt’s wide open stance.”  A cut appeared next to Holt's left eye in the fourth round, though Du Plessis was in a far worse state at this time, bleeding from the nose and having a cut eye himself. After a “gory fifth round”, Holt pressured Du Plessis through the next two rounds, dropping him in the sixth. By the seventh round Du Plessis's cut was so bad that he could not continue the bout.

The pair were to fight again only 10 days later, on 22 September 1956 in Salisbury, Rhodesia. Holt dropped Du Plessis three times in the first round, winning by TKO in the second.

Stoffel du Plessis retired from professional boxing after this fight.

Personal life
Du Plessis moved to Klerksdorp in the mid 1950s, an area from which the family hailed originally. He worked privately as a bricklayer, before becoming a mason at Hartbeestfontein gold mine to the east of the town. He worked there up to his retirement nearly thirty years later. For many years, Du Plessis was coach of the Klerksdorp amateur boxing club. Both his sons were to train there, earning Transvaal colours. His oldest son would become South African University Champion at welterweight in 1979, representing the University of Pretoria where he studied to become a veterinary surgeon. Later South African heavyweight champion, Kallie Knoetze, grew up in this gym as an amateur.

Du Plessis was a staunch supporter of the Herstigte Nasionale Party, especially under the leadership of Jaap Marais. In later life, Du Plessis raced pigeons as a hobby. He died on 8 March 2000 at his home in Klerksdorp, after a short battle with lymphoma.

Professional boxing record

References

External links

1932 births
2000 deaths
Alumni of Helpmekaar Kollege
Middleweight boxers
Afrikaner people
Afrikaner nationalists
People from Klerksdorp
Transvaal people
South African male boxers
South African Protestants
Deaths from cancer in South Africa
South African people of Dutch descent
South African people of German descent